Borei O'Svay Sen Chey is a newly established district located in Stung Treng province, Cambodia according to Sub Decree No. 06. Borei O'Svay Sen Chey is divided into three communes – O'Svay, Koh Sneng, and Preah Romkel – which were previously part of Thala Borivat district.

Administration
The following table shows the villages of Borei O'Svay Sen Chey by communes.

References

Districts of Stung Treng province